DNA photolyase may refer to:
 DNA photolyase (protein domain)
 Deoxyribodipyrimidine photo-lyase, an enzyme
 (6-4)DNA photolyase, an enzyme